The Indian pond heron or paddybird (Ardeola grayii) is a small heron. It is of Old World origins, breeding in southern Iran and east to the Indian subcontinent, Burma, and Sri Lanka. They are widespread and common but can be easily missed when they stalk prey at the edge of small water-bodies or even when they roost close to human habitations. They are however distinctive when they take off with bright white wings flashing in contrast to the cryptic streaked olive and brown colours of the body. Their camouflage is so excellent that they can be approached closely before they take to flight, a behaviour which has resulted in folk names and beliefs that the birds are short-sighted or blind.

Description

They appear stocky with a short neck, short thick bill and buff-brown back. In summer, adults have long neck feathers. Its appearance is transformed from their dull colours when they take to flight, when the white of the wings makes them very prominent. It is very similar to the squacco heron, Ardeola ralloides, but is darker-backed. To the east of its range, it is replaced by the Chinese pond heron, Ardeola bacchus.

During the breeding season, there are records of individuals with red legs. The numbers do not suggest that this is a normal change for adults during the breeding season and some have suggested the possibility of it being genetic variants.

Erythristic plumage has been noted. The race phillipsi has been suggested for the populations found in the Maldives, however this is not always recognized. It forms a superspecies with the closely related Chinese pond heron, Javan pond heron and the Madagascar pond heron.

They are usually silent but may make a harsh croak in alarm when flushed or near their nests.

This bird was first described by Colonel W. H. Sykes in 1832 and given its scientific name in honour of John Edward Gray. Karyology studies indicate that pond herons have 68 chromosomes (2N).

Behaviour and ecology

They are very common in India, and are usually solitary foragers but numbers of them may sometimes feed in close proximity during the dry seasons when small wetlands have a high concentration of prey. They are semi-colonial breeders. They may also forage at garbage heaps. During dry seasons, they sometimes take to foraging on well watered lawns or even dry grassland. When foraging, they allow close approach and flush only at close range. They sometimes form communal roosts, often in avenue trees over busy urban areas.

Food and feeding
The Indian pond heron's feeding habitat is marshy wetlands. They usually feed at the edge of ponds but make extensive use of floating vegetation such as water hyacinth to access deeper water. They may also on occasion swim on water or fish from the air and land in deeper waters. They have also been observed to fly and capture fishes leaping out of water.
 Sometimes, they fly low over water to drive frogs and fishes towards the shore before settling along the shoreline. They have been noted to pick up crumbs of bread and drop them on the water surface to bait fishes.

The primary food of these birds includes crustaceans, aquatic insects, fishes, tadpoles and sometimes leeches (Herpobdelloides sp.). Outside wetlands, these herons feed on insects (including crickets, dragonflies and bees), fish (Barilius noted as important in a study in Chandigarh) and amphibians.

Breeding

The breeding season begins with the onset of the monsoons. They nest in small colonies, often with other wading birds, usually on platforms of sticks in trees or shrubs. Most nests are built at a height of about 9 to 10 m in large leafy trees. The nest material is collected by the male while the female builds the nest. Three to five eggs are laid. The eggs hatch asynchronously, taking 18 to 24 days to hatch. Both parents feed the young. Fish are the main diet fed to young. Nest sites that are not disturbed may be reused year after year.

Mortality factors
They have few predators but injured birds may be taken by birds of prey.

An arbovirus that causes "Balagodu", trematodes and several other parasites have been isolated from the species. Antibodies to Japanese encephalitis and West Nile virus has been detected in pond herons and cattle egrets from southern India. Traces of heavy metals acquired from feeding in polluted waters may be particularly concentrated in the tail feathers.

In culture

The habit of standing still and flushing only at the last moment has led to widespread folk beliefs that they are semi-blind and their name in many languages includes such suggestions. In Sri Lanka the bird is called kana koka which translates as "half-blind heron" in the Sinhala language. The Hindustani phrase "bagla bhagat" has been used to describe a "wolf in sheep's clothing" or a hypocrite appearing like a meditating saint and occurs in a Marathi proverb. The paddy-bird also appears as a character in the Hitopadesha where, in one story, it takes injury to itself to save a king. The bird was noted by Anglo-Indian naturalist-writers for the surprising transformation in colours. Phil Robinson described the bird as one that sits all dingy gray and flies all white. It is said to have been eaten by many in India in former times.

During the height of the plume trade, feathers were collected from the "paddy bird" and exported to Britain.

References

Other sources

External links
 Internet Bird Collection
 Calls of Indian Pond Heron
 

Indian pond heron
Indian pond heron
Birds of South Asia
Birds of Myanmar
Indian pond heron
Birds of Nepal